Philibert-Louis Debucourt, (13 February 1755 – 22 September 1832) was a French painter and engraver.

Life

Debucourt, was born in Paris in 1755, and became a pupil of Vien. He executed a few plates in mezzotint, such as the Heureuse famille, the Benediction de la mariée, and the Cruche cassée, after his own designs. Most of his work was, however, in  aquatint. He became the leading maker of multi-plate colour prints, combining washes of aquatint with line-engraving. He used a number of different techniques, but most involved three colour plates, and a fourth key plate, outlining the design in black.

Debucourt's father-in-law was the sculptor Louis-Philippe Mouchy. In the marriage contract Mouchy generously offered to provide a three-room apartment at the Louvre, where Debucourt lived for twelve and a half years. The address of this apartment is often given on his prints.
Some of his work was satirical, such as La promenade publique, an aquatint of 1792 showing a crowd in the gardens the Palais-Royal. As well as work from his own designs, he made aquatints after Carle Vernet, including the Horse Frightened by a Lion, the Horse Frightened by Lightning and the Strayed Huntsman.

Debucourt was  assisted for some years by his pupil and nephew, Jean-Pierre-Marie Jazet. He died at Belleville in 1832.

References

Sources

External links
Prints & People: A Social History of Printed Pictures, an exhibition catalog from The Metropolitan Museum of Art (fully available online as PDF), which contains material on Philibert-Louis Debucourt (see index)
 Prints by Debourcourt in the British Museum

18th-century French painters
French male painters
19th-century French painters
French engravers
Painters from Paris
1755 births
1832 deaths
18th-century engravers
19th-century engravers
19th-century French male artists
18th-century French male artists